The New Zealand budget for fiscal year 2014/15 was presented to the New Zealand House of Representatives by Finance Minister Bill English on 15 May 2014. This was the sixth budget English has presented as Minister of Finance.

Reactions 
 Economics commentator Bernard Hickey said the budget "buried" a "[p]opulation forecast [that] will mean higher interest rates."
 Political columnist John Armstrong stated the budget "robs Labour of election punch."

References

External links
 New Zealand Treasury - Budget 2014
 New Zealand Herald - Budget 2014

Budget, 2014
New Zealand budgets
New Zealand budget
May 2014 events in New Zealand